Interwar military aircraft are military aircraft that were developed and used between World War I and World War II, also known as the Golden Age of Aviation.

For the purposes of this list this is defined as aircraft that entered service into any country's military after the armistice on 11 November 1918 and before the Invasion of Poland on 1 September 1939.

Aircraft are listed alphabetically by their country of origin. Civilian aircraft modified for military use are included but those that remained primarily civilian aircraft are not.

List

Argentina
FMA AeC.2 trainer and observation
FMA AeMB.2 bomber

Australia
Tugan Gannet transport

Belgium
ACAZ C.2  fighter
LACAB GR.8 reconnaissance bomber
Renard R.31 reconnaissance
Stampe et Vertongen RSV.22 trainer
Stampe et Vertongen RSV.26 trainer
Stampe et Vertongen RSV.32 trainer
Stampe et Vertongen SV.5 Tornado trainer

Brazil
CAP-4 Paulistinha  trainer
Muniz M-7 trainer
Muniz M-9 trainer

Bulgaria
DAR 1 trainer

Canada
Canadian Vickers Vigil trainer/transport
Canadian Vickers Vista patrol
Canadian Vickers Vancouver patrol seaplane
Canadian Vickers Varuna patrol seaplane
Canadian Vickers Vedette patrol seaplane
Curtiss Canuck  trainer
Curtiss-Reid Rambler trainer
Fleet Fawn trainer
Fleet Finch trainer

Czechoslovakia
Aero A.14 reconnaissance
Aero A.18 fighter
Aero A.32 army co-operation
Aero A.100 light reconnaissance bomber
Aero A.101 light reconnaissance bomber
Avia B.122 trainer
Avia BH-3 fighter
Avia BH-21 fighter
Avia BH-33 fighter
Avia B-534 fighter
Letov Š-4 fighter
Letov Š-16 bomber
Letov Š-20 fighter
Letov Š-28 reconnaissance
Letov Š-31 fighter
Praga BH-41 trainer
Praga E-39 trainer

Denmark
Orlogsværftet H-Maskinen reconnaissance
Orlogsværftet O-Maskinen reconnaissance/trainer

Estonia
Post, Tooma & Org PTO-4 trainer

Finland
VL Sääski trainer
VL Kotka patrol bomber
VL Paarma trainer 
VL Tuisku trainer
VL Viima  trainer
VL Pyry trainer

France
Amiot 120 bomber
Amiot 143 bomber
ANF Les Mureaux 113 reconnaissance
Besson MB.411 submarine observation floatplane
Blériot 127 bomber
Blériot-SPAD S.51 fighter
Blériot-SPAD S.61 fighter
Blériot-SPAD S.81 fighter
Blériot-SPAD S.91 fighter
Blériot-SPAD S.510 fighter
Bloch MB.81 ambulance
Bloch MB.120 transport
Bloch MB.131 reconnaissance bomber
Bloch MB.200 bomber
Bloch MB.210 bomber
Breguet 19 light reconnaissance bomber
Breguet 270 Series reconnaissance
Breguet 413 light reconnaissance bomber
Breguet 460 light bomber
Breguet 470 transport
CAMS 37 reconnaissance flying boat
CAMS 55 reconnaissance flying boat
Caudron C.59 trainer
Caudron C.60 trainer
Caudron C.270 trainer
Caudron C.440 Goéland transport
Caudron Simoun light transport
Caudron C.690 trainer
Dewoitine D.1 fighter
Dewoitine D.9 fighter
Dewoitine D.21 fighter
Dewoitine D.27 fighter
Dewoitine D.371 fighter
Dewoitine D.500 fighter
Farman F.60 Goliath transport/night bomber
Farman F.160 heavy bomber
Farman F.220 heavy bomber/transport
FBA 17 flying boat trainer
FBA 19 flying boat bomber
FBA 290 vip transport flying boat
Gourdou-Leseurre GL.2 fighter
Gourdou-Leseurre GL.30 fighter/racer
Gourdou-Leseurre GL-812 HY reconnaissance floatplane
Hanriot HD.14 trainer
Hanriot HD.17 floatplane trainer
Hanriot HD.19 trainer
Hanriot HD.28 trainer
Hanriot HD.32 trainer
Hanriot H.43 trainer
Hanriot H.180 light transport/liaison
Latécoère 290 floatplane torpedo bomber
Latécoère 300 maritime reconnaissance flying boat
Latham 43 flying boat bomber
Latham 47 transatlantic flying boat
Levasseur PL.4 carrier-based reconnaissance
Levasseur PL.5 carrier-based fighter
Levasseur PL.7 torpedo bomber
Levasseur PL.14 torpedo bomber
Levasseur PL.15 torpedo bomber
Lioré et Olivier LeO 20 night bomber
Lioré et Olivier LeO 214 transport
Lioré et Olivier LeO 25 bomber
Loire 46 fighter
Loire 70 maritime reconnaissance flying boat
Loire 130 reconnaissance flying boat
Morane Saulnier MoS.35 trainer
Morane-Saulnier MoS.50 trainer
Morane-Saulnier MS.130 trainer
Morane-Saulnier MS.138 trainer
Morane-Saulnier MS.147 trainer
Morane-Saulnier MS.180 trainer
Morane-Saulnier MS.225 fighter
Morane-Saulnier MS.230 trainer
Morane-Saulnier MS.315 trainer
Morane-Saulnier MS.341 trainer
Morane-Saulnier MS.406 fighter
Nieuport 28 C.1 fighter 
Nieuport-Delage NiD 29 fighter
Nieuport-Delage NiD 52 fighter
Nieuport-Delage NiD 62 fighter
Nieuport-Delage NiD-120 fighter
Potez 15 observation
Potez 25 fighter-bomber
Potez 29 transport
Potez 39 reconnaissance/observation
Potez 452 shipboard reconnaissance flying boat
Potez 540 bomber
Potez 56 transport
Potez 58 patrol
Potez 630 heavy fighter
Romano R.82 trainer
Romano R.83 trainer
Romano R.92 trainer
 SAB-SEMA 12 trainer
 SAB AB-20 bomber
 SAB AB-80 bomber
SPAD S.XX fighter
SPCA 30 light bomber
SPCA 40T transport
SPCA 90 transport
SPCA 80 transport
Wibault 7 fighter

Germany
Ago Ao 192 transport
Albatros Al 101 trainer
Arado Ar 64 fighter
Arado Ar 65 fighter
Arado Ar 66 trainer
Arado Ar 68 fighter
Arado Ar 76 lightweight fighter
Arado Ar 95 reconnaissance floatplane
Arado Ar 96 trainer
Arado Ar 196 reconnaissance floatplane
Arado SC I trainer
Arado SC II trainer
Blohm & Voss Ha 137 ground attack
Blohm & Voss Ha 140 floatplane torpedo bomber
Bücker Bü 131 trainer
Bücker Bü 133 trainer
DFS SG 38 Schulgleiter training glider
Dornier Do J seaplane
Dornier Do Y bomber
Dornier Do 11 bomber
Dornier Do 17 bomber
Dornier Do 18 flying boat patrol bomber
Dornier Do 19 heavy bomber
Dornier Do 22  reconnaissance torpedo bomber
Dornier Do 23 bomber
Dornier Do 24 patrol bomber flying boat
Dornier Do 26 flying boat patrol bomber
Fieseler Fi 156 observation
Fieseler Fi 167 torpedo bomber
Flettner Fl 265 experimental helicopter
Focke-Wulf Fw 44 trainer
Focke-Wulf Fw 56 advanced trainer
Focke-Wulf Fw 58 trainer
Focke-Wulf Fw 61  experimental helicopter
Focke-Wulf Fw 187 heavy fighter
Focke-Wulf Fw 200 transport/bomber
Gotha Go 145 trainer
Heinkel He-2 reconnaissance floatplane 
Heinkel HE 8 reconnaissance floatplane
Heinkel HD 17 reconnaissance 
Heinkel HD 24 trainer floatplane 
Heinkel HD 25 reconnaissance floatplane
Heinkel HD 36 trainer 
Heinkel HD 37 fighter 
Heinkel HD 38 fighter 
Heinkel HD 55 reconnaissance flying boat 
Heinkel He 42 trainer 
Heinkel He 45 light bomber 
Heinkel He 46 army co-operation/reconnaissance
Heinkel He 50 dive bomber
Heinkel He 51 fighter
Heinkel He 59 torpedo bomber/reconnaissance floatplane
Heinkel He 60 shipboard reconnaissance floatplane
Heinkel He 70 transport/bomber
Heinkel He 72 trainer
Heinkel He 111 bomber/transport
Heinkel He 112/A7He fighter
Heinkel He 114 reconnaissance floatplane
Heinkel He 116 long range transport
Heinkel He 118 dive bomber
Henschel Hs 123 dive bomber
Henschel Hs 126 observation
Junkers A 20 fighter 
Junkers A 35 trainer 
Junkers A 48/K 47 trainer/dive bomber
Junkers F.13 transport/trainer
Junkers Ju 52 transport
Junkers Ju 86 bomber/transport
Junkers Ju 87 dive bomber
Junkers Ju 90 transport
Junkers K 30 bomber
Junkers K 37 bomber/reconnaissance
Junkers T.21 reconnaissance
Junkers W.34/K 43 transport
Klemm Kl 25 trainer
Klemm Kl 35 trainer
Messerschmitt Bf 108 trainer
Messerschmitt Bf 109 fighter
Messerschmitt Bf 110 heavy fighter
Messerschmitt Bf 161  reconnaissance
Rohrbach Roland transport/trainer
Siebel Fh 104 transport
Udet U 12 trainer

Hungary
Weiss WM-10 Ölyv trainer
Weiss WM-16 reconnaissance/bomber
Weiss WM-21 Sólyom reconnaissance/bomber

Italy
Ansaldo A.120 reconnaissance
Breda A.4 trainer
Breda A.7 reconnaissance
Breda A.9 trainer
Breda Ba.25 trainer
Breda Ba.27 fighter
Breda Ba.64 ground-attack/light bomber
Breda Ba.65 ground-attack/light bomber
Breda Ba.88 ground-attack/light bomber
CANT 25 flying boat fighter
CANT Z.501 reconnaissance flying boat
CANT Z.506 transport floatplane
CANT Z.1007 bomber
Caproni Ca.73 transport/bomber
Caproni Ca.100 trainer
Caproni Ca.101 transport/bomber
Caproni Ca.111 reconnaissance bomber
Caproni Ca.113 trainer
Caproni Ca.114 fighter
Caproni Ca.133 transport/bomber
Caproni Ca.135 medium bomber
Caproni Ca.164 trainer
Caproni A.P.1 attack/light bomber
Caproni Ca.310 reconnaissance bomber
Fiat R.2 reconnaissance
Fiat B.R. bomber
Fiat BR.20 Cicogna bomber
Fiat CR.1 fighter
Fiat CR.20 fighter
Fiat CR.30 fighter
Fiat CR.32 fighter
Fiat CR.42 fighter
Fiat RS.14 maritime reconnaissance floatplane
IMAM Ro.30 observation
IMAM Ro.37 reconnaissance
IMAM Ro.41 fighter
IMAM Ro.43 reconnaissance floatplane
IMAM Ro.44 floatplane fighter
Macchi M.14 fighter
Macchi M.15 reconnaissance bomber/trainer
Macchi M.18 flying boat bomber
Macchi M.24 flying boat bomber
Macchi M.41 bis flying boat fighter 
Macchi M.71 flying boat fighter
Nardi FN.305 liaison/trainer
Nardi FN.315 trainer
Piaggio P.6 reconnaissance floatplane
Piaggio P.10 reconnaissance floatplane
Piaggio P.32 bomber
Savoia-Marchetti S.55 flying boat transport/bomber/record aircraft
Savoia-Marchetti S.57 reconnaissance flying boat
Savoia-Marchetti S.59 reconnaissance bomber flying boat
Savoia-Marchetti SM.62 maritime reconnaissance flying boat
Savoia-Marchetti S.72 bomber/transport
Savoia-Marchetti SM.78 reconnaissance bomber flying boat
Savoia-Marchetti SM.79 bomber
Savoia-Marchetti SM.81 bomber/transport
SIAI S.16 reconnaissance bomber flying boat
SIAI S.67 flying boat fighter

Japan
Aichi D1A carrier-based dive bomber
Aichi E3A reconnaissance floatplane
Aichi E10A reconnaissance seaplane
Hiro H1H maritime reconnaissance bomber flying boat
Hiro H2H maritime reconnaissance bomber flying boat
Hiro H4H maritime reconnaissance bomber flying boat
Hiro G2H long-range reconnaissance bomber
Kawanishi E7K reconnaissance floatplane
Kawanishi H3K maritime reconnaissance bomber flying boat
Kawasaki Army Type 88 reconnaissance
Kawasaki Army Type 92 fighter
Kawasaki Ka 87 night bomber
Kawasaki Ki-3 light bomber
Kawasaki Ki-10 fighter
Kawasaki Ki-32 light bomber
Mitsubishi 1MF carrier-based fighter
Mitsubishi 1MT torpedo bomber
Mitsubishi 2MB1 light bomber
Mitsubishi A5M carrier-based fighter
Mitsubishi B1M carrier-based bomber
Mitsubishi B5M carrier-based bomber
Mitsubishi F1M reconnaissance float plane
Mitsubishi G3M heavy bomber
Mitsubishi K3M trainer
Mitsubishi Ki-1 heavy bomber
Mitsubishi Ki-2 heavy bomber
Mitsubishi Ki-15 light reconnaissance bomber
Mitsubishi Ki-20 heavy bomber
Mitsubishi Ki-21 heavy bomber
Mitsubishi Ki-30 light bomber
Nakajima A1N carrier-based fighter
Nakajima A2N carrier-based fighter
Nakajima E2N reconnaissance floatplane
Nakajima E4N reconnaissance floatplane
Nakajima E8N reconnaissance floatplane
Nakajima Army Type 91 fighter
Nakajima Ki-4 reconnaissance
Nakajima Ki-6 transport
Nakajima Ki-27 fighter
Nakajima Ki-34 light transport
Tachikawa Ki-9 trainer
Tachikawa Ki-17 trainer
Tachikawa Ki-36 army cooperation
Yokosuka B3Y carrier-based torpedo bomber
Yokosuka B4Y carrier-based bomber
Yokosuka E1Y reconnaissance floatplane
Yokosuka E5Y reconnaissance floatplane
Yokosuka H5Y maritime reconnaissance bomber flying boat
Yokosuka K4Y floatplane trainer
Yokosuka K5Y trainer
Yokosuka Ro-go Ko-gata reconnaissance floatplane

Latvia 
 VEF I-12 trainer
 VEF I-14 sport 
 VEF I-15 trainer
 VEF I-16  fighter
 VEF I-17 trainer

Lithuania
Dobi-II reconnaissance
ANBO III trainer
ANBO IV reconnaissance/light bomber
ANBO 41 reconnaissance/light bomber
ANBO V trainer
ANBO 51 trainer
ANBO VI trainer/liaison
ANBO VIII bomber

Netherlands
Fokker C.I reconnaissance
Fokker C.IV reconnaissance
Fokker C.V light reconnaissance bomber
Fokker C.VIIW reconnaissance floatplane
Fokker C.Xlight bomber
Fokker C.XIW
Fokker D.X fighter
Fokker D.XI fighter
Fokker D.XIII fighter
Fokker D.XVI fighter
Fokker D.XVII fighter
Fokker D.XXI fighter
Fokker F.VII transport
Fokker F.IX bomber
Fokker S.II trainer
Fokker S.III trainer
Fokker S.IV trainer
Fokker S.IX trainer
Fokker T.IV torpedo bomber
Fokker T.V torpedo bomber

Koolhoven F.K.51 trainer
Koolhoven F.K.56 trainer
NVI F.K.31 fighter

Norway
Marinens Flyvebaatfabrikk M.F.4 floatplane trainer
Marinens Flyvebaatfabrikk M.F.5 maritime reconnaissance floatplane
Marinens Flyvebaatfabrikk M.F.6 floatplane trainer
Marinens Flyvebaatfabrikk M.F.7 floatplane trainer
Marinens Flyvebaatfabrikk M.F.8 floatplane trainer
Marinens Flyvebaatfabrikk M.F.9 floatplane fighter
Marinens Flyvebaatfabrikk M.F.11 maritime reconnaissance floatplane

Poland
Lublin R-VIII reconnaissance bomber
Lublin R-XIII army-cooperation
PWS-5 liaison aircraft
PWS-10 fighter
PWS-14 trainer
PWS-16 trainer
PWS-26 advanced trainer
PZL P.7 fighter
PZL P.11 fighter
PZL.23 Karaś light bomber/reconnaissance
PZL P.24 fighter
PZL.37 Łoś medium bomber
RWD 8 trainer
RWD-14 Czapla army-cooperation

Romania
IAR 14 fighter-trainer
IAR 37 light reconnaissance bomber
SET 3 trainer
SET 7 trainer/reconnaissance

Siam (Thailand)
Boripatra bomber

Spain
AME VI reconnaissance and light attack
CASA III trainer
González Gil-Pazó GP-1 trainer
Hispano E-30 intermediate trainer
Hispano HS-34 basic trainer
Loring R-I reconnaissance and light attack
Loring R-III reconnaissance and light attack

Sweden
FVM J.23 fighter 
Sparmann P1 advanced trainer 
Svenska Aero Jaktfalken fighter

Switzerland
EKW C-35 reconnaissance
Häfeli DH-5 reconnaissance

USSR
Beriev Be-2 reconnaissance floatplane
Beriev MBR-2 reconnaissance flying boat 
Bolkhovitinov DB-A bomber
Grigorovich I-2 fighter
Grigorovich I-Z fighter
Kharkov KhAI-5/Neman R-10 light reconnaissance bomber
Polikarpov I-3 fighter
Polikarpov I-5 fighter
Polikarpov I-15 fighter
Polikarpov I-153 fighter
Polikarpov I-16 fighter
Polikarpov P-2 trainer
Polikarpov Po-2 trainer
Polikarpov R-5 light reconnaissance bomber
Polikarpov R-Z light reconnaissance bomber
Shavrov Sh-2 small amphibian
Tupolev ANT-3 reconnaissance
Tupolev ANT-7 bomber/reconnaissance/transport
Tupolev ANT-20 8 engine transport
Tupolev I-4 fighter
Tupolev TB-1 bomber
Tupolev TB-3 bomber
Tupolev SB bomber
Yakovlev UT-1 trainer
Yakovlev UT-2 trainer

United Kingdom
Airspeed Oxford trainer
Armstrong Whitworth A.W.16 fighter, evaluated by UK but only sales were to Nationalist Chinese
Armstrong Whitworth Atlas army co-operation
Armstrong Whitworth Scimitar fighter
Armstrong Whitworth Siskin fighter
Armstrong Whitworth Whitley bomber
Avro 504N trainer
Avro 549 Aldershot bomber
Avro Anson bomber/trainer
Avro Bison fleet spotter/reconnaissance
Avro 621 Tutor trainer
Avro 626 Prefect trainer
Avro 643 Cadet trainer
Blackburn F.1 Turcock fighter
Blackburn F.2 Lincock fighter
Blackburn F.3 fighter
Blackburn 2F.1 Nautilus fighter
Blackburn R.1 Blackburn spotter/reconnaissance
Blackburn R.2 Airedale reconnaissance
Blackburn R.B.1 Iris maritime patrol flying boat
Blackburn R.B.2 Sydney maritime patrol flying boat
Blackburn R.B.3 Perth maritime patrol flying boat
Blackburn T.1 Swift torpedo bomber floatplane
Blackburn T.2 Dart torpedo bomber
Blackburn T.3 Velos bomber floatplane
Blackburn T.4 Cubaroo torpedo bomber
Blackburn T.5 Ripon reconnaissance/torpedo bomber
Blackburn T.7B bomber/reconnaissance
Blackburn T.8 Baffin torpedo bomber
Blackburn T.9 Shark torpedo bomber
Blackburn B-2 trainer
Blackburn B-3 M.1/30 torpedo bomber
Blackburn Baffin torpedo bomber
Blackburn B-6 Shark torpedo bomber
Blackburn Skua fighter/dive bomber
Blackburn Roc fighter/dive bomber
Boulton Paul Sidestrand bomber
Boulton Paul Overstrand bomber
Bristol Blenheim bomber
Bristol Bombay bomber/transport
Bristol Bulldog fighter
Bristol F.2B Mk.IV Fighter fighter 
Fairey III.F reconnaissance 
Fairey Battle bomber
Fairey Fawn bomber
Fairey Firefly II fighter
Fairey Flycatcher fighter
Fairey Fox fighter
Fairey Gordon light bomber
Fairey Hendon bomber
Fairey Seafox reconnaissance floatplane 
Fairey Seal fleet spotter/reconnaissance
Fairey Swordfish torpedo bomber
Gloster Gamecock fighter
Gloster Gauntlet fighter
Gloster Gladiator fighter
Gloster Grebe fighter
Gloster Nightjar fighter
Gloster Sparrowhawk fighter
Handley Page Hampden bomber
Handley Page Harrow bomber/transport
Handley Page Heyford bomber
Handley Page Hyderabad bomber
Handley Page Hinaidi bomber
Hawker Fury fighter
Hawker Hart light bomber
Hawker Hind light bomber
Hawker Horsley bomber
Hawker Hurricane fighter
Hawker Nimrod fighter
Hawker Woodcock fighter
Saro London maritime reconnaissance seaplane
Short Rangoon maritime reconnaissance seaplane
Short Singapore maritime reconnaissance seaplane
Short Sunderland maritime reconnaissance seaplane
Supermarine Scapa maritime reconnaissance seaplane
Supermarine Seagull
Supermarine Southampton maritime reconnaissance seaplane
Supermarine Spitfire fighter
Supermarine Stranraer maritime reconnaissance seaplane
Supermarine Walrus spotter and reconnaissance amphibian
Vickers Valentia transport
Vickers Valparaiso light bomber
Vickers Vernon transport
Vickers Victoria transport
Vickers Viking utility amphibian
Vickers Vildebeest/Vincent army cooperation and torpedo bomber
Vickers Vimy heavy bomber
Vickers Virginia heavy bomber
Vickers Vixen fighter/bomber
Vickers Wellesley bomber
Vickers Wellington bomber
Westland Lysander army co-operation
Westland Wallace army co-operation
Westland Walrus fleet spotter/reconnaissance
Westland Wapiti army co-operation

United States
Beechcraft Model 18 transport & trainer
Berliner-Joyce F2J carrier-based fighter
Berliner-Joyce OJ observation
Berliner-Joyce P-16 fighter
Boeing XB-15 heavy bomber
Boeing FB/PW-9 fighter/carrier-based fighter
Boeing F2B carrier-based fighter
Boeing F3B carrier-based fighter
Boeing F4B fighter/carrier-based fighter
Boeing NB trainer
Boeing P-12 fighter
Boeing P-26 Peashooter fighter
Consolidated O-17 Courier observation
Consolidated P-30 fighter
Consolidated P2Y patrol flying boat
Consolidated PBY Catalina patrol flying boat
Consolidated PT-1 trainer
Consolidated PT-11 trainer
Curtiss A-8 light bomber
Curtiss A-12 Shrike light bomber
Curtiss BF2C Goshawk carrier-based fighter-bomber
Curtiss F5L patrol flying boat
Curtiss F6C Hawk carrier-based fighter
Curtiss F7C Seahawk carrier-based fighter
Curtiss F9C Sparrowhawk carrier-based fighter
Curtiss F11C Goshawk carrier-based fighter/fighter-bomber
Curtiss Falcon observation/bomber/fighter-bomber
Curtiss Fledgling trainer
Curtiss P-1 Hawk fighter
Curtiss P-6 Hawk fighter
Curtiss P-36 Hawk fighter
Curtiss SBC Helldiver carrier-based dive bomber
Curtiss SOC Seagull observation
De Havilland USD-4 bomber
Douglas B-18 Bolo heavy bomber
Douglas C-1 transport
Douglas Dolphin utility/transport amphibian
Douglas DT torpedo bomber
Douglas O-2 observation
Douglas O-35 observation/bomber
Douglas O-38 observation
Douglas O-43 observation
Douglas O-46 observation
Douglas T2D torpedo bomber
Douglas TBD Devastator torpedo bomber
Fokker PW-5 fighter/trainer
General Aviation PJ air-sea rescue flying boat
Great Lakes BG carrier-based dive bomber
Grumman FF fighter
Grumman F2F fighter
Grumman F3F fighter
Grumman Goose utility flying boat
Grumman JF Duck utility amphibian
Grumman J2F Duck utility amphibian
Hall PH patrol flying boat
Huff-Daland TW-5 trainer
Huff-Daland LB-1 light bomber
Keystone B-3 bomber
Keystone B-4 bomber
Keystone B-5 bomber
Keystone B-6 bomber
Keystone LB-5 light bomber
Keystone LB-6/LB-7 light bomber
Loening OL amphibious observation
Lockheed Model 212 transport/bomber
Martin B-10 bomber
Martin BM bomber
Martin NBS-1 night bomber
Martin T3M torpedo bomber
Martin T4M torpedo bomber
Martin MO observation
Naval Aircraft Factory N3N Canary trainer
Naval Aircraft Factory PN patrol seaplane
Naval Aircraft Factory TS fighter
North American BT-9 trainer
North American BT-14 trainer
North American NA-16 trainer
North American O-47 observation
Northrop BT dive bomber
Northrop Delta transport/patrol
Orenco D fighter
Packard-Le Peré LUSAC-11 observation
Seversky P-35 fighter
Stearman 75 trainer
Stearman 76 armed trainer
Thomas-Morse MB-3 fighter
Thomas-Morse O-19 observation
Verville-Sperry M-1 Messenger communications
Verville-Packard R-1 racer
Verville-Sperry R-3 racer
Vought FU fighter
Vought O2U Corsair observation
Vought SBU Corsair carrier-based fighter/dive bomber
Vought SB2U Vindicator carrier-based dive bomber
Vought VE-7 trainer
Vultee V-1 transport/bomber
Waco Custom Cabin Series light transport
Waco Standard Cabin series light transport
Waco D Series observation/bomber
Waco F series trainer

Yugoslavia
Ikarus ŠM flying boat trainer
Ikarus IK 2 fighter
Ikarus IO reconnaissance flying boat

Interwar
Military equipment of the interwar period